Shane Murphy may refer to:

Shane Murphy (footballer) (born 1955), Australian rules footballer
Shane Murphy (hurler) (born 1983), Cork player

See also
Shayne Murphy (born 1952), Australian politician